Dreams Like Deserts is the debut EP by the Norwegian black metal band Aura Noir.

Track listing
"The Rape" – 3:26
"Forlorn Blessings To The Dreamking" – 3:29
"Dreams, Like Deserts" – 5:00
"Angel Ripper" – 3:50
"Snake" – 1:51
"Mirage" – 2:58

Personnel
Aggressor − guitars, bass, drums, vocals
Apollyon − guitars, bass, drums, vocals

1995 albums
Aura Noir albums